Gergő Fazekas (born 31 October 2003) is a Hungarian handball player who plays for Wisła Płock and the Hungarian national team.

Career

Club
In the 2018/19 season, Gergő played for the first time in the second division in the NB I/B. He was not even 15 years old when he made his debut. In his first senior season, he scored 26 goals in 10 games. In November 2021, it was announced that he would continue his career at Telekom Veszprém from the summer of 2022. They signed a 4-year contract with him. For the first two years of his contract, he was loaned to Polish side Wisła Płock. In Plock in the summer of 2022, during the preparation, he suffered a serious shoulder injury. He had surgery, then made his comeback in February 2023 after 6 months of rehabilitation.

National team
He was called up to the Hungarian national team for the first time in October 2021 by the then Hungarian national team head coach István Gulyás. He was included in the large squad of the 2022 European Men's Handball Championship, but in the end he did not become a member of the narrow squad. On March 19, 2022, he made his international debut in the Hungarian national team, (selected by Chema Rodríguez) in Gummersbach against Germany.

Personal life
His father, Nándor Fazekas, is a former legendary national handball player who played in the Hungarian national handball team.

Honours

Club
Veszprém KKFT Felsőörs
Magyar Kupa
: 2022

Individual
 Hungarian Adolescent Handballer of the Year: 2019
 Hungarian Youth Handball Player of the Year: 2021

References

External links
 Gergő Fazekas at EHF 

2003 births
Hungarian male handball players
Living people
People from Veszprém
Expatriate handball players in Poland
Hungarian expatriate sportspeople in Poland
Wisła Płock (handball) players
Sportspeople from Veszprém County